The Weavers: Wasn't That a Time! is a 1982 documentary film about the folk group The Weavers and the events leading up to the band’s 1980 reunion concert at Carnegie Hall.

The film was the inspiration for the 2003 mockumentary film A Mighty Wind.

Awards

Won
Kansas City Film Critics Circle Awards 1983:
Best Documentary
American Cinema Editors 1984:
Eddie Award - Best Edited Documentary

Nominated
BAFTA Awards 1983:
Flaherty Documentary Award - Jim Brown

See also

List of films featuring diabetes

References

External links

1982 films
1982 documentary films
American documentary films
Concert films
Documentary films about singers
Films directed by Jim Brown
United Artists films
The Weavers albums
1980s English-language films
1980s American films